Suruga fundicola is a species of fish in the goby subfamily, Gobionellinae. It is the only known member of the monotypic genus Suruga, which was named for Japan's Suruga Bay.

References

Gobionellinae
Monotypic fish genera
Fish of Japan
Fish described in 1901